Broadcasting Corporation of Abia State (BCA) is a state government-run radio station of Abia State. Established on November 16, 1992, the broadcaster transmits programs daily on 88.1 FM.

History 
The BCA was established by edict No. 4 of 1991 promulgated by the then military Administration of Group Captain Frank Ajobene following creation of Abia in 1991, from its initial location at 70 Aba road Umuahia as its headquarter. Since inception, the corporation acquired a piece of land along the government station layout as its permanent location in 1998 is presently housing the corporate Headquarters of the station with slogan “The Station Born To Lead’’.

Director Generals 

Since its inception, the BCA has had Eight Director-Generals as follows;

Chief Anyim Ude 1991–1996
Chukwunenye Enwere 1997 —1997
Chief Chuzi Iboko 1999 —2003
Mr. Mike Alaukwu 2003 — 2007
Chief Chinedu Ogbugbu 2007 —2011
Mr. Tito Ezemdi Ukeka 2011 — 2015
Chief Sir Alozie Ndulaka 2015 — 2016
Sir Uchenna T. Dike 2016 — 2019
Anyaso Anyaso O 2019 — Till Date.

Notes 

Radio stations in Nigeria
Mass media in Nigeria
1992 establishments in Nigeria